Charadros or Charadrus may refer to:

Charadros, a river of Achaea, Greece
Charadrus, a town of ancient Cilicia, now in Turkey
Charadrus (Acte), a city of ancient Acte, now Mt Athos, Greece
Charadrus (Epirus), a town of ancient Epirus, Greece